Battle of Bandanwara was fought between Mewar and Mughal forces in 1711 AD, between Hurda and Bandanwara, near Khari river in Bhilwara district, Rajasthan.

Background
Maharana Amar Singh II had captured Mandalgarh, Badnore and Pur Mandal after death of Aurangzeb. But Mughals had not granted any written deeds for these Parganas. After death of Maharana Amar Singh II, Bahadur Shah granted Pur Mandal to Ranbaz Khan Mewati in Feb-March, 1711 AD. Ranbaz Khan moved with his own army, along with 5-7 thousand-strong force sent by Mir Bakshi Zulfikar Khan, to take control of the territory.

Preparation

News of invasion reached Udaipur and Maharana Sangram Singh - II dispatched a large army, consisting of various chiefs of Mewar: 
 Devbhan Chauhan of Kotharia
 Umaid Singh of Shahpura
 Jai Singh of Badnor
 Rawat Maha Singh of Kanore
 Rawat Surat Singh, brother of Rawat Maha Singh
 Rawat Sangram Singh of Deogarh
 Samant Singh of Salumbar
 Surajmal Solanki of Desuri
 Rawat Gangdas of Baansi
 Suraj Singh Rathore of Limara
 Devi Singh Chundawat of Begun
 Hathi Singh Dodiya
 Prithviraj Chundwat of Amet
 Sahab Singh Rathore, ancestor of Rathores of Rupaheli
 Surat Singh Mertiya of Ghanerao

Battle

Mughal and Mewari forces met near Khari river. Mughal forces had archers on elephants and horses. Attack of Mewar forces was so quick, that the Mughal archers could draw only once and the Mewar cavalry reached very near and hand-to-hand combat ensued. Maha Singh of Kanore fell in the battle, Jai Singh of Badnore and Samant Singh of Salumbar were wounded in the battle. Ranzbaz Khan, along with his brother Nahar Khan and other close relatives, were killed in the battle. Mughal forces suffered massive casualties and were defeated. Deendar Khan fled with remaining army to Ajmer, his camp was captured by Mewari forces. With this battle, Mewar succeeded to retain its control on this territory.

References

Sources 
 
 
 

 

History of Rajasthan
Haldighati
Bandanwara
Bandanwara
Bandanwara
Bandanwara